Lepidium graminifolium, the grassleaf pepperweed, is a species of annual herb in the family Brassicaceae. They have a self-supporting growth form and simple, broad leaves. Flowers are visited by Ruiziella luctuosa. Individuals can grow to 51 cm tall.

Sources

References 

graminifolium
Flora of Malta